Thapa family may refer to:
Thapa dynasty or Thapa family, family of Bhimsen Thapa, the most significant political family
Family of Amar Singh Thapa (Elder)
Amar Singh Thapa (father)
 Ranadhoj Thapa (son)
 Ranajor Singh Thapa (son)
Family of Surya Bahadur Thapa
Surya Bahadur Thapa (father)
Sunil Bahadur Thapa (son)
Family of Bhekh Bahadur Thapa
Bhekh Bahadur Thapa (father)
Bhaskar Thapa (son)
Manjushree Thapa (daughter)
Family of Kamal Thapa
Kamal Thapa (brother)
Ganesh Thapa (brother)
Family of Bhakti Thapa
Bhakti Thapa (patron)
Arjun Bahadur Thapa (descendant)

See also
Thapa (disambiguation)

Nepalese Hindus
Nepalese politicians